Happiest Season is a 2020 American holiday romantic comedy-drama film directed by Clea DuVall, who co-wrote the screenplay with Mary Holland. Starring an ensemble cast consisting of Kristen Stewart, Mackenzie Davis, Alison Brie, Aubrey Plaza, Dan Levy, Holland, Victor Garber, and Mary Steenburgen, the film follows a woman who struggles to admit to her conservative parents that she is a lesbian while she and her girlfriend visit them during Christmas. DuVall has said the film is a semi-autobiographical take on her own experiences with her family.

Produced by TriStar Pictures, the film was released in the United States on November 25, 2020, by Hulu, and internationally on November 26, by Sony Pictures Releasing and Entertainment One. The film received positive reviews from critics, with praise for the cast. The film won a GLAAD Media Award in April 2021 in the "Outstanding Film - Wide Release" category.

Plot 

Abby Holland and Harper Caldwell are a couple who have been dating nearly a year. Abby has disliked Christmas since her parents died, so Harper spontaneously invites her to celebrate the holidays with her family in her hometown. Abby sees this as the perfect opportunity to introduce herself to Harper's parents and propose to her on Christmas morning. However, on their way to the Caldwells', Harper reveals she lied about already coming out to her parents, fearing it would interfere with her father's mayoral campaign. She promises to come out to her family after Christmas, but asks Abby to pretend to be her straight roommate for the holiday, to which Abby reluctantly agrees.

At the Caldwells', Abby meets Harper's father, Ted, her perfectionist mother, Tipper, and her infantile artistic sister, Jane. She is welcomed by the family as Harper's "orphan friend" who has nowhere else to go for Christmas. Abby becomes uncomfortable, especially when she meets Harper's exes, Connor and Riley. During the visit, she begins questioning how much she knows about her girlfriend when she sees Ted and Tipper's high expectations and Harper's competitive relationship with her older sister, Sloane.

Ted is trying to impress a possible donor from the city council to contribute to his campaign, which Abby unwittingly jeopardizes when Sloane's children slip an unpaid necklace into her bag during an outing to the mall. Labeled a shoplifter, Ted and Tipper think it might be better if they keep Abby away from upcoming social events. From this point, Abby feels even more of an outsider. She also learns from Riley that Harper has publicly denied her sexuality since she was a high school freshman, which makes Abby worried about their future.

At the Caldwells' annual Christmas Eve party, Abby, having tired of her current situation, is relieved when her friend John arrives to pick her up. Harper privately begs her to stay and as they are about to kiss, they are caught by Sloane who prepares to expose their relationship to the family. However, it turns out, Sloane has her own secret: she and her husband, Eric, are getting a divorce. The sisters get into a public fight, ending with Sloane outing Harper as a lesbian, which Harper tries to deny. Heartbroken, Abby leaves the house, with John following her, and the two talk about their stories of coming out to their respective families: Abby's parents were loving and accepting, while John's father threw him out of the house and didn't talk to him for thirteen years. John reminds Abby that coming out can be terrifying for gay people, but has nothing to do with Harper's love for her.

After realizing her fear of rejection caused her to hurt Riley and may cause her to lose Abby, Harper finally tells her parents that she is a lesbian. This inspires Sloane to reveal her own secret and even Jane tells her parents how neglected she felt over the years. Despite this, Abby still departs with John, feeling she has been too hurt to give Harper another chance.

Tipper confronts Ted, detailing the emotional pain their daughters have clearly experienced due to their parenting choices. Harper goes after Abby to apologize, confessing that she truly loves her and wants to build a life with her. Touched, and with encouragement from John, Abby forgives her and they share a kiss.

The next morning, Ted apologizes to his daughters for making them feel they always had to meet his standard of perfection. He later gets a phone call from the campaign donor, who will support him only if Harper suppresses any details about her personal life. Ted rejects the offer. The Caldwells then take a family picture, with Abby included this time.

One year later, Abby and Harper got engaged, Jane has become a bestselling author with her fantasy novel, The Shadow Dreamers, and Ted has won the mayoral election. On Christmas Eve, the family goes to the cinema to watch It's a Wonderful Life. As the movie starts, Abby and Harper smile at each other lovingly.

Cast

Production 
In April 2018, TriStar Pictures acquired the worldwide distribution rights to the film Happiest Season, with Clea DuVall set to direct from a script she co-wrote with Mary Holland, and production by Marty Bowen and Isaac Klausner through their Temple Hill Productions, with co-financing from Entertainment One, whose theatrical arm will handle UK and Canadian distribution, and with Sony Pictures handling distribution elsewhere through the TriStar label. DuVall said that "in a lot of ways, this movie is autobiographical" and she wrote the film to see her own experiences depicted on-screen.

In November 2018, Kristen Stewart signed on to star in the film, with Mackenzie Davis joining the cast in January 2019. The remaining cast was rounded out in January 2020, with the additions of Mary Steenburgen, Victor Garber, Alison Brie, Aubrey Plaza and Dan Levy.

Principal photography began on January 21, 2020, in Pittsburgh and wrapped on February 28, 2020, shortly before the film industry was halted due to the COVID-19 pandemic. During an interview on The Late Show with Stephen Colbert in December 2020, Plaza revealed that various people on set, including Stewart, tested positive for COVID-19 around the time they were filming.

Music

Soundtrack 

The soundtrack of the film was released on November 6, 2020. The soundtrack stays true to the film's holiday premise, as it's mostly full of Christmas music and features new Christmas tunes by queer pop luminaries such as Sia, Shea Diamond and sister act Tegan and Sara. Their synth-pop song “Make You Mine This Season” became the prototype for the rest of the soundtrack, all the other songs were written after it.

Score 

The film's score was released on November 20, 2020.  It was composed by Amie Doherty, who is best known for her work in Legion and Star Trek: Discovery.

Release 
Happiest Season was released digitally in the United States on November 25, 2020, by Hulu. It was previously scheduled for a theatrical release on November 20, 2020, and later rescheduled to November 25, before it was purchased by Hulu due to the COVID-19 pandemic. 
Samba TV estimated that 416,680 U.S. households watched the film in its opening weekend, the best debut in Hulu's history.

The film was still distributed internationally by Sony Pictures Releasing International, under its TriStar Pictures label, while Entertainment One Films handled distribution in the United Kingdom and Canada. The film's original soundtrack was released on November 6, 2020, through Warner Records and features songs by Anne-Marie, Bebe Rexha, Shea Diamond, Sia, Brandy Clark, Carlie Hanson, and Tegan and Sara among others.

Happiest Season was then released on Blu-Ray and DVD internationally by Sony Pictures Home Entertainment on March 3, 2021.

Reception 
On review aggregator Rotten Tomatoes, the film holds an approval rating of  based on  reviews, with an average rating of 6.8/10. The website's critics consensus reads, "A jolly good time with heartfelt performances and more than enough holiday cheer, all you'll want for Christmas is Happiest Season." On Metacritic, it has a weighted average score of 69 out of 100, based on 31 critics, indicating "generally favorable reviews".

Leah Greenblatt of Entertainment Weekly gave the film a B+ and described it as "a smart, heartfelt comedy whose small flaws are easily blotted out by bigger charms." Reviewing the film for the Chicago Tribune, Michael Phillips gave it three out of four stars, saying that, despite his general distaste for movies revolving around a secret, "It works. It's built. And the people seem real, or at least reality-adjacent."

Several reviews named Mary Holland (who played Jane) as the film's breakout star.

Happiest Season won the 2021 GLAAD Media Award for Outstanding Film (Wide Release) and received Special Recognition for its soundtrack.

Future 
In December 2020, DuVall said "I would love to do a sequel. I mean, I have a couple of ideas. We all had such a great time making the movie that we were talking about it then. But it was also just like, who knew if anybody would care about the movie or not? So I definitely am more than open to it." In May 2021, Mary Holland said that the sequel is in "early stages".

See also
 List of Christmas films

References

External links 

 
 
 

2020s English-language films
2020s American films
2020s Christmas comedy-drama films
2020 films
2020 romantic comedy-drama films
2020 LGBT-related films
American romantic comedy-drama films
American Christmas comedy-drama films
American LGBT-related films
Lesbian-related films
Gay-related films
LGBT-related romantic comedy-drama films
Films about anti-LGBT sentiment
Films about elections
Films about sisters
Films about vacationing
Same-sex marriage in film
Films directed by Clea DuVall
Films scored by Amie Doherty
Films set in Pittsburgh
Films shot in Pittsburgh
TriStar Pictures films
Entertainment One films
Hulu original films